Golden Goal is a comedy talkshow about sports, hosted by Johan Golden and Henrik Elvestad on Norwegian TV2. The show features interviews with athletes, presentations of exotic and unusual sports from around the world, comedic reenactments of sports history events, and tests of "improvements" to well known sports. The show is currently – in its 3rd season - holding a market share of about 35% in its time slot.

Guests
Each week Johan invites a high-profile guest for the show's main interview. Johan portrays his guests in a thorough, curious and feelgood fashion, the main emphasis being on conveying why we are such a big fan of theirs. The guests range from current/recent athletes such as Aksel Lund Svindal (alpine skiing) and Kjetil André Aamodt (alpine skiing), Ole Einar Bjørndalen (biathlon), Andreas Thorkildsen (javelin), Marit Bjørgen (cross country skiing) and Anders Jacobsen (ski jump) to evergreen sporting heroes such as Johann Olav Koss (skating), Gunde Svan (cross country skiing), Thomas Ravelli (football), Jan Boklöv (ski jump) and Thomas Alsgaard (cross country skiing). In addition the show has been guested by popular Norwegian TV commentators the likes of Davy Wathne (TV2) and Arne Scheie (NRK), and profiled coaches and sports personalities such as Nils Arne Eggen (former Rosenborg manager), Åge Hareide (former national team coach), Ståle Solbakken (former national team player, now manager) and John Shittu (football agent).

Sports history reenactments 
Johan has taken on the mission to recreate some of the greatest moments in the history of sports - mainly in Norwegian terms, but also internationally. Together with the athletes themselves, he has done remakes of:
• High points such as Norway's unlikely World Cup win against Brazil in 1998, and Bruce Grobbelaars European Cup-winning spaghetti legs of 1984. 
• Thrillers such as the Norwegian handball team beating the invincible girls from East Germany in 1986, and the cross country skiing drama when Oddvar Brå broke his skiing pole and ultimately shared his victory with Russia's Savyalov. 
• Comic low points such as Erik Thorstvedt's devastating debut as a Tottenham goalkeeper in 1989, goalie Bjarte Flem's infamous own goal, and coach Harald Aabrekks embarrassing dive towards the end of a match, pretending to be "dead" in order to waste time.

To make a proper remake of these great and not-so-great moments, Johan invites the protagonists themselves to partake in the re-investigation. The decisive penalty of the Norway-Brazil World Cup match was recreated by the help of Kjetil Rekdal (penalty taker), Egil "Drillo" Olsen (coach), Nils Johan Semb (assistant coach) and Arne Scheie (sports commentator). In the remake of Norway's handball win against DDR, Johan re-instated the entire Norwegian team dating from 1986, a set of 10 original heroes including the coach and the back-when TV commentators.

At times the actual protagonists are somewhat difficult to get by, as in the remake of international player Svein Grøndalen's brutal meeting with a moose. Whereas Grøndalen played himself, Johan stepped up to the plate to portray the angry moose.

Portraits 
Henrik has travelled across Norway and Europe to visit and spend a day with international footballers, athletes and childhood heroes such as Morten Gamst Pedersen, Henning Solberg, Aksel Lund Svindal, Ailo Gaup, Jørn Andersen and Preben Elkjær. Henrik often gets a crack at their sport – on visiting Henning Solberg during the shakedown to "Rally Catalunya" this year, Henrik got to take a spin in Solberg's car himself (after having congested the engine a couple of times). He also tried to impress Gamst Pedersen with his keepy-uppie, with only partial success.

Henrik not only visits highly successful Scandinavian athletes. In spring 2007 he went to Scotland to visit the lowest paid Norwegian professional – Carl Erik Thywissen, earning £10 a week playing for Scotland's lousiest league club, East Stirlingshire F.C. That is, it was said to be the lousiest, until recently. After the segment was aired on Golden Goal, a Norwegian supporter branch was established and grew quickly to become the third biggest supporter club in Norway for a British team. This sudden interest and warming attention is said to have given the club a vital injection this season, making East Stirlingshire a midtable team and hopefully securing them a continued stay in the Scottish league system.

Exotic Sports 
During the series, Henrik has visited, tried out and presented for the viewers a wide range of "exclusive" and "exotic" sports around the world. And all his fears and physical shortcomings come in the way. Canarian wrestling, a sport for giants on the Canary Isles, bobsleighs doing 125 km/h, reindeer racing in 30 below zero, boomerang throwing, Australian Rules football, polo, cricket, Morrisdancing, rugby and the noble art of streaking are amongst the activities he has tried so far.

The Locker Room 
When the match is over, the contest is won, and the cameras are turned off - what is really going on in the athletes' private sphere, "behind closed doors"? A number of famous sports personalities tell us their best stories – Erik Thorstvedts lets us in on Paul Gascoigne's crazy antics, Lasse Kjus and Kjetil André Aamodt tell on each other's secret fears, and Erland Johnsen lets us know what Vinnie Jones really was up to.

Challenges 
In the segment type called "The Challenge" Henrik has invited a number of celebrities to give it a go at well known sports, such as athletics, diving, gymnastics, weightlifting and kayaking. The celebrities include Norwegian actors, comedians, musicians, a priest, TV-presenters amongst others.

Sport improvements 
In this segment type, the presenters take well-known sports, suggest improvements to them, and try them out together with known athletes. For example, they have tested biathlon with machine guns and military vehicles, electro shock football, automobile curling and hillside football.

Top 3 
In the recurring studio segment "This week's Top 3", Henrik presents bloopers from all kinds of sports. He sheds a weekly light on comic mishaps, presenting lists such as: 
"So you thought you came in first?", "Audience, stay where you are", "Ouch! I'm glad that wasn’t me" and "Hey goalie, what the !?D"# %&% were you thinking?".

References

TV 2 (Norway) original programming
Norwegian comedy television series
Norwegian television talk shows